The Municipality of Souris – Glenwood is a rural municipality (RM) in the Canadian province of Manitoba.

History

The RM was incorporated on January 1, 2015 via the amalgamation of the RM of Glenwood and the Town of Souris. It was formed as a requirement of The Municipal Amalgamations Act, which required that municipalities with a population less than 1,000 amalgamate with one or more neighbouring municipalities by 2015. The Government of Manitoba initiated these amalgamations in order for municipalities to meet the 1997 minimum population requirement of 1,000 to incorporate a municipality.

Demographics 

Attractions 
The Souris Sand Hills (49°39′34″N, 100°21′42″W) are located west of Souris and north of Plum Creek on the western side of the municipality of Souris – Glenwood. The sand hills are glacial deposits left from glacial lakes and deltas from the last ice age.

References 

2015 establishments in Manitoba
Manitoba municipal amalgamations, 2015
Populated places established in 2015
Rural municipalities in Manitoba